The Japan Series (officially the Japan Championship Series), also the Nippon Series, is the annual championship series in Nippon Professional Baseball, the top baseball league in Japan. It is a best-of-seven series between the winning clubs of the league's two circuits, the Central League and the Pacific League, and is played in October or November. The first team to win four games is the overall winner and is declared  each year. The Japan Series uses a 2-3-2 format.

The home team for games 1, 2 and eventually 6 and 7, alternates between the two leagues with the Pacific League having the advantage on the years ending with an odd number and the Central League on the years ending with an even number. Designated hitters are used if the team from the Pacific League hosts the game. There is a 40-man postseason roster limit, and the rule on drawn games is changed to 12 innings, since 2018.  If the series is tied after the seventh game, a Game 8 will be held with the same team hosting Games 6 and 7 hosting this game. Only once a Game 8 has been played in Japan Series history, where the Seibu Lions defeated the Hiroshima Toyo Carp in 1986. In the event that Game 8 does not decide the series, the next game would be played at the stadium that hosted Games 3 through 5 after a day of rest, and games will continue until one team wins four games.

The team with the most championships is the Yomiuri Giants, who have won the Japan Series twenty-two times.  In 2004, the Pacific League instituted a three-team stepladder playoff format to determine the league champion, while the Central League champion had a long wait before the Japan Series.  During this time, the Pacific League won four consecutive Series from 2003 to 2006.  Starting with the 2007 postseason, both leagues adopted the Climax Series to determine their champions.  The Climax Series involves the top three finishers in each league, though the format gives a significant advantage to the team with the best record in each league.

On November 6, 2010, the Chunichi Dragons and Chiba Lotte Marines played the longest game in Japan Series history. It lasted fifteen innings and resulted in a 2–2 draw, with the game lasting 5 hours and 43 minutes. Only Game 2 of the 2022 Japan Series on October 23, 2022 came close, with the Orix Buffaloes and Tokyo Yakult Swallows playing to a 3-3 draw after 12 innings, lasting 5 hours and 3 minutes.

Even though the Central League is historically more victorious, in recent years, the Pacific League has been catching up in titles. Currently, Pacific League has 37 Japan Series victories, while Central League has 36. Between 2013 and 2020, Pacific League won the Japan Series 8 times in a row. Six of them were by the Fukuoka SoftBank Hawks, and one each by the Hokkaido Nippon-Ham Fighters and Tohoku Rakuten Golden Eagles. The streak was broken in 2021, with the Tokyo Yakult Swallows beating the Orix Buffaloes.

List of winners

Kazuhisa Inao, as an exception, won the Fighting Spirit Award (in 1956) while playing for the victorious Nishitetsu Lions.

Extra inning rules
With changes introduced as of 2018, the current rules stipulate that the first seven games originally scheduled are called if tied after 12 innings, and if extra games are necessary, the games are played until a victor is decided (unlimited innings), with no curfew limitations.

Historically:
 Until 1966 (except 1964): Game is called at sunset (all games were played as day games)
 1964 (all games at night): No new inning may start after 10:30 p.m.
 1967-1981: No new inning may start after 5:30 p.m.
 1982-1986: No new inning may start after the game time reaches four-and-a-half hours
 1987-1993: 18-inning limit until Game 7, unlimited innings Game 8 and onward (change introduced due to Game 8 being necessary in the 1986 series due to Game 1 being called after 14 innings)
 1994: 18- (day game) / 15-inning (night game) limit until Game 7, unlimited innings Game 8 and onward
 1995-2017: / 15-inning limit until Game 7, unlimited innings Game 8 and onward
 The three-and-a-half hour cut-off rule used in the 2011 regular season was not used for the Japan Series.
 Since 2018: 12-inning limit until Game 7, unlimited innings Game 8 and onward

Teams by number of wins

The franchise currently known as the Saitama Seibu Lions had a Japan Series record of 3–2 as the Nishitetsu Lions.
The franchise currently known as the Fukuoka SoftBank Hawks had a Japan Series record of 2–8 as the Nankai Hawks, and 2-1 as the Fukuoka Daiei Hawks.
The franchise currently known as the Orix Buffaloes had a Japan Series record of 3–7 as the Hankyu Braves, and 1–1 as the Orix BlueWave.  It took its current name in 2005 after merging with the Osaka Kintetsu Buffaloes.
The franchise currently known as the Chiba Lotte Marines had a Japan Series record of 1–0 as the Mainichi Orions, 0–1 as the Daimai Orions, and 1–1 as the Lotte Orions.
The franchise currently known as the Hokkaido Nippon-Ham Fighters had a Japan Series record of 1–0 as the Toei Flyers.
The franchise has a Japan Series record of 1-0 as Yokohama Baystars and a Japan Series record of 1–0 as the Taiyō Whales.
The Osaka Kintetsu Buffaloes were merged with the Orix BlueWave in 2005 to form the Orix Buffaloes. 
The Shochiku Robins were merged with the Taiyō Whales in 1953, eventually becoming the Yokohama DeNA BayStars.

Leagues by number of wins

Streaks and droughts
 The Yomiuri Giants won nine consecutive Japan Series championships from 1965 to 1973.  The second-longest streak is four consecutive championships, accomplished by the Fukuoka Hawks from 2017 to 2020. Three consecutive championships have been accomplished by the Yomiuri Giants (1951–1953), the Nishitetsu Lions (1956–1958), the Hankyu Braves (1975–1977), and twice by the Seibu Lions (1986–1988 and 1990–1992).
 The Yomiuri Giants also won five consecutive Central League pennants from 1955 to 1959, and 19 of the 23 Central League pennants from 1951 to 1973.  The Giants also won two consecutive Central League pennants on several other occasions.  The only other teams to win consecutive Central League pennants are the Hiroshima Toyo Carp (1979–1980), the Yakult Swallows (1992–1993), and the Chunichi Dragons twice (2006–2007 and 2010–2011). 
 The Nankai Hawks won three consecutive Pacific League pennants twice (1951–1953 and 1964–1966).  The Hankyu Braves won nine of the 12 Pacific League pennants from 1967 to 1978, including three consecutive (1967–1969) and four consecutive (1975–1978).  The Seibu Lions won 11 of the 14 Pacific League pennants from 1985 to 1998, including four consecutive (1985–1988) and five consecutive (1990–1994).
 Franchises have gone 20 years or more without a Japan Series championship over the following intervals:  
Osaka Kintetsu Buffaloes,  years (1950–2004, the entire franchise history; the drought extends to 72 years if one includes the history of the merged Orix Buffaloes, who finally won the 2022 Japan Series).
Chunichi Dragons,  years (1955–2006)
Toei Flyers / Nippon-Ham Fighters,  years (1963–2005)
Taiyo Whales / Yokohama BayStars,  years (1961–1997)
Hiroshima Toyo Carp,  years (1985–present)
Hanshin Tigers,  years (1986–present)
Hanshin Tigers,  years (1950–1984)
Nankai/Fukuoka Hawks,  years (1965–1998)
Lotte Orions / Chiba Lotte Marines,  years (1975–2004)
Hiroshima Toyo Carp,  years (1950–1978)
Kokutetsu Swallows / Sankei Atoms / Yakult Swallows,  years (1950–1977)
Hankyu Braves,  years (1950–1974)
Mainichi/Daimai/Tokyo/Lotte Orions,  years (1951–1973)
Nishitetsu Lions / Seibu Lions,  years (1959–1981)
 Franchises have gone 20 years or more without a league pennant over the following intervals:  
Taiyo Whales / Yokohama BayStars,  years (1961–1997)
Lotte Orions / Chiba Lotte Marines,  years (1975–2004)
Osaka Kintetsu Buffaloes,  years (1950–1978)
Hiroshima Toyo Carp,  years (1950–1974)
Nankai/Fukuoka Hawks,  years (1974–1998)
Nippon-Ham Fighters,  years (1982–2005)
Hiroshima Toyo Carp,  years (1992–2016)
Hanshin Tigers,  years (1965–1984)

See also
 
 Nippon Professional Baseball
 Asia Series

References

 
Baseball competitions in Japan
Recurring sporting events established in 1950